is a Japanese singer and actress who had a minor role in the 2004 movie Swing Girls.

References

1983 births
Japanese idols
Japanese women pop singers
People from Obihiro, Hokkaido
Living people
21st-century Japanese actresses
21st-century Japanese singers
21st-century Japanese women singers